Hy Pyke (born Monty Pike, December 2, 1935 – October 26, 2006) was an American character actor.

Biography
Pyke was born in Los Angeles, California, the son of vaudevillian David Pike and his wife Pauline. Pyke majored in theatre at UCLA in the 1960s, appearing in numerous student films, including one for Ray Manzarek, keyboard player of The Doors, called Induction (1965), which also featured the Doors' vocalist Jim Morrison in a brief role. During that time period, Pyke was also associated with actor Del Close.

Career 
After graduating from UCLA, Pyke began his career as a character actor in low-budget and independent films. Pyke also has a small part in the John Milius film Dillinger (1973). Although many of his better known films are in the horror genre, Pyke acted in everything from blaxploitation to musical comedies. He had a uniquely manic acting style, with a penchant for exaggerated physical comedy, marked by a distinctive, raspy voice.

Besides his film work, Pyke acted in theater, musical revues, etc.

During the 1970s, Pyke appeared in the 1975 horror film Lemora: A Child's Tale of the Supernatural, Dolemite (1975), The First Nudie Musical (1976) and Spawn of the Slithis (1978). Pyke played the part of Bebe Rebozo in an unreleased Richard Nixon satire called The Way He Was.

Pyke became more known for his role as Taffey Lewis in the science fiction movie Blade Runner (1982). Other noteworthy 1980s appearances include the teen comedy film Bad Manners (1984), starring Martin Mull and Karen Black, and the horror comedy film Vamp (1986), starring Grace Jones. Towards the end of the 1980s, Pyke's acting career slowed down and he began acting in television commercials. His last movie role was in the low-budget, straight-to-video 1988 horror film Hack-O-Lantern.

Pyke last lived in Los Angeles, performing as a nightclub comedian after surviving quadruple bypass surgery. In 2004, he contributed to a book about obscure 1970s genre films, Gods in Polyester, reminiscing on Lemora, Dolemite and others, in a style very much in tune with his on-screen persona. Pyke also contributed pieces on Blade Runner and Hack-O-Lantern to the book Gods In Spandex, A Survivor's Account of 80's Cinema Obscura (2007), a sequel to Gods In Polyester. He was also interviewed for an E! True Hollywood Story episode on David Carradine in 2000. Pyke's final film appearance was in Dealing, released posthumously in 2012.

Legacy
YouTube film reviewers Red Letter Media watched and discussed Pyke's film Hack-O-Lantern (along with Vampire Assassin and Cathy's Curse) in episode 58 of their series Best of the Worst, released on October 26, 2017. Jay Bauman concluded that Pyke's performance was "the most compelling thing about the movie" and "consistently compelling," while Jack Packard added that Pyke was "the hallmark" of the film. Hack-O-Lantern was voted "best of the worst" of that episode, garnering two votes from the panel of four.

Partial filmography
 Lemora: A Child's Tale of the Supernatural (1975) - The Bus Driver
 Dolemite (1975) - Mayor Daley
 White House Madness (1975) - B.B. Reboza
 The First Nudie Musical (1976) - Benny
 Pyke plays the singing and dancing Uncle Benny, one of the financial backers of the First Nudie Musical. He appears in a few key scenes in the beginning of the film, and later makes brief appearances until the end. One of the stars of the film is Cindy Williams of Laverne & Shirley fame.
 The Erotic Adventures of Don Quixote (aka When Sex Was a Knightly Affair) (1976) - Sancho Panza
 Hollywood High (1976) - Mr. Flowers
 Nightmare in Blood (1977) - Harris
 Ziegfeld: The Man and His Women (1978) - Unnamed
 A TV movie on the life of Florenz Ziegfeld; Pyke's only television acting credit outside of commercials.
 Spawn of the Slithis (1978) - Jack Dunn
 Every Girl Should Have One (1978) - Willie
 Smokey and the Judge (1980) - Club Owner / Mr. Kuntz
 Blade Runner (1982) - Taffey Lewis
 Bad Manners (aka: Growing Pains) (1984) - Mr. Slatt
 Vamp (1986) - Desk Clerk
 Hack-O-Lantern (aka Halloween Night) (1988) - Grandpa
 Fatal Choice (1995) - Mickey
Living Luminaries (The Serious Business Of Happiness) (2007/Gotham Metro Studios)
 Dealing (2012) - Hy
 Final film role, released posthumously

Bibliography
Gods In Polyester, or, A Survivors' Account of 70's Cinema Obscura (2004/Succubus Press)
– Pyke contributed pieces on Lemora, The First Nudie Musical, Spawn of the Slithis, Dolemite, The Erotic Adventures of Don Quixote and Nightmare in Blood.

Gods In Spandex, or, A Survivors' Account of 80's Cinema Obscura (2007/Succubus Press)
– Pyke contributed pieces on Blade Runner and Hack-O-Lantern.

References

External links

1935 births
2006 deaths
Male actors from Los Angeles
American male comedians
American male film actors
American male stage actors
American male television actors
University of California, Los Angeles alumni
Comedians from California
20th-century American comedians
20th-century American male actors